Edward Payson "Ed" Ferry (born June 18, 1941) is an American competition rower and Olympic champion.

Born in Seattle, Washington, Ferry won a gold medal in coxed pairs at the 1964 Summer Olympics with Conn Findlay. They were first partnered in 1961, when Ferry was a 19-year-old sophomore at Stanford with only a year of rowing experience.

He won a gold medal at the 1963 Pan American Games.

References

1941 births
Rowers at the 1964 Summer Olympics
Olympic gold medalists for the United States in rowing
Stanford Cardinal rowers
Rowers from Seattle
Living people
American male rowers
Medalists at the 1964 Summer Olympics
Pan American Games medalists in rowing
Pan American Games gold medalists for the United States
Rowers at the 1963 Pan American Games
Medalists at the 1963 Pan American Games